Tømmerneset Church is a parish church of the Church of Norway in Hamarøy Municipality in Nordland county, Norway. It is located in the village of Tømmerneset. It is one of the churches for the Sagfjord parish which is part of the Ofoten prosti (deanery) in the Diocese of Sør-Hålogaland. The white, wooden church was built in a long church style in 1952 using plans drawn up by the architect Eiliv Dahl. The church seats about 110 people.

See also
List of churches in Sør-Hålogaland

References

Hamarøy
Churches in Nordland
Wooden churches in Norway
20th-century Church of Norway church buildings
Churches completed in 1952
1952 establishments in Norway
Long churches in Norway